James Charles Marshall (16 January 1882 – 21 August 1950) was an Australian rules footballer who played with St Kilda in the Victorian Football League (VFL).

Family
The son of George Grasby Marshall (1844-1883), and Maria Anne Marshall (-1915), née Cooper,  James Charles Marshall was born in Fitzroy, Victoria on 16 January 1882.

He married Janet Eliza Tonkin (-1948) in 1916; they had three children.

Football

St Kilda (VFL)
Recruited from South Melbourne Juniors, he played one match for the St Kilda First XVIII, against Melbourne, at the Junction Oval on 7 May 1904.

North Melbourne (VFA)
Cleared from St Kilda in June 1904,  he played five matches for North Melbourne in the VFA.

Death
He died at the Caulfield Convalescent Hospital on 21 August 1950.

References

External links 

1882 births
1950 deaths
Australian rules footballers from Melbourne
St Kilda Football Club players
North Melbourne Football Club (VFA) players
People from Fitzroy, Victoria